The Yearling is a novel by American writer Marjorie Kinnan Rawlings, published in March 1938. It was the main selection of the Book of the Month Club in April 1938. It won the 1939 Pulitzer Prize for the Novel.

It was the best-selling novel in the United States in 1938, when it sold more than 250,000 copies. It was the seventh-best seller in 1939. The book has been translated into Spanish, Chinese, French, Japanese, German, Italian, Russian, and 22 other languages. 

Rawlings's editor was Maxwell Perkins, who also worked with F. Scott Fitzgerald, Ernest Hemingway, and other literary luminaries. She had submitted several projects to Perkins for his review, and he rejected them all. He advised her to write about what she knew from her own life, and The Yearling was the result.

Plot
Young Jody Baxter lives with his parents, Ora  and Ezra "Penny" Baxter, on a small farm in the backwoods of central Florida in the years following the Civil War. His parents had six other children before him, but they died in infancy. His mother has difficulty bonding with the boy. Jody loves the outdoors and his family. He has wanted a pet for as long as he can remember, but his mother says that they barely have enough food to feed themselves, let alone a pet.

A subplot involves the hunt for an old bear named Slewfoot that randomly attacks the Baxter livestock. Later the Baxters and the rowdy Forresters get in a fight about the bear and continue to fight about nearly anything. (While the Forresters are presented as a disreputable clan, the disabled youngest brother, Fodder-Wing, is a close friend to Jody.) The Forresters steal the Baxters' hogs. While Jody and his father Penny are out searching for the stolen stock, Penny is bitten in the arm by a rattlesnake. Penny shoots a doe, in order to use its liver to draw out the snake's venom. This saves Penny's life but leaves an orphaned fawn.

Jody convinces his parents to allow him to adopt the fawn and it becomes his constant companion.  He later learns that Fodder-Wing named it Flag. The book explores Jody's life as he matures along with Flag. Jody struggles with strained relationships, hunger, death of beloved friends, and the capriciousness of nature through a catastrophic flood. He also has tender moments with his family, the fawn, and their neighbors and relatives. Along with his father, he comes face to face with the rough life of a farmer and hunter. Throughout, the well-mannered, God-fearing Baxters and the good folk of nearby Volusia and the "big city," Ocala, are starkly contrasted with their hillbilly neighbors, the Forresters.

As Jody takes his final steps into maturity, he is forced to make a desperate choice between Flag and his family. The parents realize that the growing Flag is endangering their survival, as he persists in eating the corn crop on which the family is relying for food the next winter. Jody's father orders the boy to take Flag into the woods and shoot him, but Jody cannot bring himself to do it. 

When his mother shoots the deer and wounds him, Jody is forced to shoot Flag and kill the yearling. In blind fury, Jody runs off, only to come up against the true meaning of hunger, loneliness, and fear. After an ill-conceived attempt to reach an older friend in Boston while traveling in a broken-down canoe, Jody is picked up by a mail ship and returned to Volusia. In the end, Jody comes of age, assuming increasingly adult responsibilities in the difficult "world of men", but always surrounded by the love of family.

Characters
Ezra "Penny" Baxter was raised by a stern minister who allowed no leisure or slacking. He treats his son Jody generously because of his own upbringing. He was serving in the army during the Civil War. Nicknamed "Penny" by Lem Forrester because of his diminutive size.
Ora Baxter: Jody's mother. She is introduced on page 20 as "Ora." Penny calls her "Ory". She is often called "Ma" or "Ma Baxter".
Jody Baxter: The son of Ora and Penny Baxter.
Flag: Jody's pet fawn.
The Forresters: (Pa and Ma Forrester, Buck, Mill-Wheel, Arch, Lem, Gabby, Pack, Fodder-wing) A family that lives near the Baxters. Though Ora dislikes them strongly, they are friends of Penny and Jody.  However, there is occasional conflict between them and the Baxters.  
Fodder-wing Forrester: Jody's best friend. He is crippled and was born with a hunched frame. He is thought to be rather peculiar, but has a great fondness for animals.
Julia: Hound dog owned by the Baxters. She is treasured by Penny but distrusts Jody.
Rip: Bulldog owned by the Baxters.
Perk: Feist dog owned originally by the Baxters but traded to the Forresters for a new gun later in the novel.
Doc Wilson:An acquaintance of Penny.

Adaptations
The novel was adapted into a film of the same name in 1946, starring Gregory Peck as Penny Baxter and Jane Wyman as Ora Baxter.  Both were nominated for Oscars for their performances. Claude Jarman Jr. as Jody Baxter won the Juvenile Award Oscar.

In 1949, Claude Pascal adapted the film into a newspaper comic, under its French title Jody et le Faon (Jody and the Fawn).

A Broadway musical adaption with music by Michael Leonard and lyrics by Herbert Martin was produced by The Fantasticks producer Lore Noto in 1965. The book was written for the stage by Lore Noto and Herbert Martin. David Wayne and Delores Wilson played Ezra and Ora Baxter, and David Hartman, later of Good Morning America, was Oliver Hutto. The show played only three performances.

Barbra Streisand recorded four songs from the show: "I'm All Smiles", "The Kind of Man A Woman Needs", "Why Did I Choose You?", and "My Pa".

A Japanese animated version was released in 1983.

The 1983 film Cross Creek, about Rawlings and the incident that inspired the novel, starred Mary Steenburgen, Rip Torn, Peter Coyote and Dana Hill.

A 1994 television adaptation starred Peter Strauss as Ezra Baxter, Jean Smart as Ora Baxter, and Philip Seymour Hoffman as Buck.

A 2012 song by singer/songwriter Andrew Peterson, "The Ballad of Jody Baxter", deals with themes from The Yearling. The song is on his album Light for the Lost Boy.

Notes
The Long homestead in the book and the film's shooting location are now part of the Ocala National Forest. Visitors can hike the Yearling Trail and pass the sites where the homes were and the now dry sinkhole, and pay respects at the Long Family Cemetery.

References
Notes

Bibliography

 Bellman, Samuel. Marjorie Kinnan Rawlings. New York: Twayne Publishers, 1974.
 Bigelow, Gordon. Frontier Eden: The Literary Career of Marjorie Kinnan Rawlings. Gainesville, FL: University Presses of Florida, 1966.
 Lee, Charles. The Hidden Public; the Story of the Book-of-the-Month Club. Garden City, NY: Doubleday, 1958.

 Silverthorne, Elizabeth. Marjorie Kinnan Rawlings. New York: The Overlook Press, 1988.
 Tarr, Rodger L. Marjorie Kinnan Rawlings: a descriptive bibliography, Pittsburgh series in bibliography.  Pittsburgh: University of Pittsburgh Press, 1996. 
 Tarr, Rodger L., editor. Max & Marjorie: The Correspondence between Maxwell E. Perkins and Marjorie Kinnan Rawlings. Gainesville: University of Florida Press, 1999.

External links
 
 University of South Carolina; an exhibition introducing the Robery D. Middendorf Collection

1938 American novels
1938 children's books
American young adult novels
Charles Scribner's Sons books
Deer and moose in popular culture
Novels about animals
Novels set in Florida
Novels set in the 1870s
Pulitzer Prize for the Novel-winning works
American novels adapted into films
American novels adapted into plays
Novels adapted into comics
American novels adapted into television shows
Fictional deer and moose